Carl Otto "Carlo" Keil-Möller, (8 December 1890 – 22 December 1958) was a Swedish actor, writer and director. He was active both on stage and in films.

Selected filmography

As Actor 
 Mästerkatten i stövlar (1918)
 Robinson i skärgården (1920)
 A Fortune Hunter (1921)
 A Maid Among Maids (1924)

As writer 
 Human Destinies (1923)
 Johan Ulfstjerna (1923)
 Unge greven ta'r flickan och priset (1924)
 A Maid Among Maids (1924)
 Adventure (1936)
 A Crime (1940)

As director  
 En flicka kommer till sta'n (1937)

References

External links

1890 births
1958 deaths
Swedish male film actors
Swedish film directors
Swedish male silent film actors
20th-century Swedish male actors
20th-century Swedish screenwriters
20th-century Swedish male writers